Familial renal amyloidosis is a form of amyloidosis primarily presenting in the kidney.

It is associated most commonly with congenital mutations in the fibrinogen alpha chain and classified as a dysfibrinogenemia (see Hereditary Fibrinogen Aα-Chain Amyloidosis). and, less commonly, with congenital mutations in apolipoprotein A1 and lysozyme.

It is also known as "Ostertag" type, after B. Ostertag, who characterized it in 1932 and 1950.

References

External links

Glomerular diseases
Amyloidosis